Lew Payton (June 27, 1874 – May 27, 1945) was an African American film actor, stage performer, and writer known for several films and stage productions including Chocolate Dandies with Josephine Baker, Smash Your Baggage (1932), Jezebel (1938), On Such a Night (1937), and Lady for a Night (1942) featuring John Wayne and Joan Blondell. In "Lady for a Night", he performed Napoleon, the Alderson Family's man servant for characters Stephen Alderson (played by Philip Merivale) and Katherine Alderson (played by Edith Barrett).

Early life
Payton was born on June 27, 1874, in Huntington, West Virginia.

Film and stage career
Payton performed as an actor in several films and stage productions. With Noble Sissle, Payton co-wrote and performed in Chocolate Dandies, a 1924 film that launched the career of Josephine Baker. Chocolate Dandies, The : "New Musical Comedy" by Noble Sissle and Lew Payton. Music and lyrics by Noble Sissle and Eubie Blake. Produced at the Colonial Theatre in Boston, the film also featured Eubie Blake and Amanda Randolph.

Writing

In 1937, Payton authored "Did Adam Sin? and Other Stories of Negro Life in Comedy-Drama and Sketches." As a member of "Black Hollywood," Payton wrote the book as an attempt to teach other African-Americans the art of screenwriting.

Film and stage productions

 The Chocolate Dandies (September 1, 1924 – November 22, 1924) as "Mose Washington" 
 Harlem (February 20, 1929 – May 1929) as "Pa Williams" 
 The Boundary Line (February 5, 1930 – Mar 1930) as "Elbert"
 Solid South (October 14, 1930 – Nov 1930) as "Jasper"
 Never No More (January 7, 1932 – Jan 1932) as "Deacon"
 Bridal Wise (May 30, 1932 – Sep 1932) as "Tom"
 Smash Your Baggage (October 29, 1932)
 Jezebel (December 19, 1933 – Jan 1934) as "Uncle Billy"
 Valiant Is the Word for Carrie (1936) as "Lons John". Starring Gladys George. 
 Did Adam Sin? (1936), a stage production written by Payton and performed by the Chicago Negro Unit of the Federal Theatre Project from 1936 to 1939.
 Racing Lady (1937) as "Joe". Starring Ann Dvorak.
 Wells Fargo (1937) as "Sam – Pryor's Butler"
 On Such a Night (1937) Starring Grant Richards and Karen Morley
 Jezebel (1938) as "Uncle Billy". Starring Bette Davis and Henry Fonda.
 The Lady's from Kentucky (1939) as "Sixty". Starring George Raft
 The Sun Never Sets (1939) as "the Village Chief". Starring Douglas Fairbanks Jr.
 Lady for a Night (1942) as "Napoleon", Alderson Family's Servant"
 Presenting Lily Mars (1943) as "Thornway's Butler". Directed by Norman Taurog featuring Judy Garland

Death
Payton died on May 27, 1945, in Los Angeles, California, USA.

Discography
 Lew Payton – A Musical Autobiography Of Louis Armstrong 1923–1925 album art All The Wrongs You've Done Me (They're Bound To Come Back To You) (as Ley Payton) Satchmo (2) – A Musical Autobiography Of Louis Armstrong 1923–1925; 4 versions	Decca	(1959)

References

1874 births
1945 deaths
African-American actors
African-American writers
Male actors from Los Angeles
20th-century African-American people
20th-century American actors
Writers from Huntington, West Virginia
Writers from Los Angeles
Male actors from West Virginia
Actors from Huntington, West Virginia